Nylon or Nylons may refer to:

Nylon polymers
 Nylon, a generic term for a class of polymers
 Nylon 66, (aka nylon 6-6, nylon 6,6 or nylon 6/6) a type of polyamide in common use
 Nylon 6, or polycaprolactam is a polymer in common use
 Nylon 11, or polyamide 11 (PA 11) is a bioplastic polyamide 
 Nylon 12, a polyamide synthesized from 12-carbon monomers
 Nylon 46 (aka nylon 4-6, nylon 4/6 or nylon 4,6, PA46, Polyamide 46), a high heat resistant polyamide 
 Nylon 4, or polybutyrolactam, a biodegradable nylon
 Nylon 1,6 (aka polyamide 1,6), a type of polyamide
 Nylon TMDT (also known as Nylon 6-3-T), a type of transparent nylon
 Econyl, a nylon made from ocean and landfill waste
 Nylon rope trick, a scientific demonstration that illustrates chemical principles

Garments and fabric

 Nylon stockings, held up by a suspender belt ("sussies") or top elastic
 Nylons, pantyhose
 Nylons, tights, a type of leggings
 Ballistic nylon, a thick, tough, nylon fabric

Music
 Nylon, a 2005–2006 album by Anna Vissi
 Nylon, an Icelandic girl band
 Nylon Beat, a Finnish former girl group
 Nylon Pink, a travel and fashion magazine and former rock band
 The Nylon Curtain, an album by Billy Joel
 The Nylons, a Canadian a cappella group

People
 Judy Nylon, a multidisciplinary artist 
 Nylon Chen, a Taiwanese singer and actor.

Firearms
 Remington Nylon 66, a rifle made with a non-wood stock
 Remington Nylon 76, a lever-action rifle

Other uses
 British Nylon Spinners (BNS), was a 1940 British company set up to produce nylon yarn
 Nylon (magazine), an American pop culture and fashion magazine
 NY-LON, a 2004 7-part drama series about a transatlantic romance
 NyLon (concept), the concept of an "intertwined" New York City and London, England
 Nylon Pool, an in-sea pool near Pigeon Point, Tobago
 Nylon riots, a series of store disturbances around the time of world war 2
 Nylon-eating bacteria, a strain of Arthrobacter